LiveOne (formerly known as LiveXLive) is a music streaming platform that combines audio and video (sometimes live) that is available in the US and Canada. Users can access the service on the web and through mobile apps on smartphones and over-the-air devices to create and share customized music stations. The platform allows users to customize one of their programmed stations (for example, Today's Hits) or start with music similar to an artist or song, and then customize that. Currently, LiveOne has 420 curated music stations.

LiveOne's business model offers free ad-supported access and subscription levels that remove ads and offer additional features.

In September 2017, LiveOne (as LiveXLive) acquired Slacker. In April 2019, the Slacker app rebranded as "LiveXLive Powered By Slacker".

History
The company was founded in 2004 by Celite Milbrandt and Dennis Mudd, who then launched the company in March 2007. Dennis was the former CEO of Music Match, which was purchased by Yahoo Music and became known as Yahoo! Music Radio.

In September 2007, the service known as Slacker Radio finalized its deals with four major labels: Sony BMG Music Entertainment, EMI, Universal, and Warner; it also announced deals with many indie labels.

In 2008, Slacker released the Slacker Portable Player, available in 2 GB, 4 GB, and 8 GB capacities. On January 9, 2008, the Slacker Portable Player received Laptop Magazine's Best of CES Portable Audio/Video Player Award.
On September 16, 2008, Slacker released a new portable player called Slacker G2.
Slacker consumer electronics, including the G2 Personal Radio Player, have since been discontinued in favor of an emphasis on smartphones and other mobile applications.
In April 2008, the company announced agreements with top music publishers, including EMI Music Publishing, Sony/ATV Music Publishing, Universal Music Publishing Group and Warner/Chappell Music. These agreements, signed before the Slacker Portable Player (since retired) launched, allowed Portable Player users to listen to cached Internet radio stations and premium radio users to save songs for later playback.

On February 13, 2013, Slacker retired its original design and logo in favor of a newer design and a simplified logo. On 14 December 2014, a redesign and relaunch incorporated a new logo, a red, white, and black color scheme, and a complete UI overhaul for all platforms.

LiveXLive purchased Slacker at the end of 2017 and combined Slacker into its streaming service, rebranding the service in April 2019 as LiveXLive Powered by Slacker.

In 2020, LiveXLive launched a partnership with American rapper Pitbull, which would grant the platform exclusive rights to concerts, behind-the-scenes, videos and more from Pitbull to be streamed to LiveXLive's premium subscribers. Also in 2020, LiveXLive acquired podcast network PodcastOne.

PodcastOne 

PodcastOne is an advertiser-supported podcast network, founded by Norm Pattiz, also founder of radio-giant Westwood One. , the service hosted over 200 podcasts. The PodcastOne studios are based in Beverly Hills, California, with offices across the US, including New York, Chicago and Denver and an Australian office and studio in Melbourne. PodcastOne was founded in 2013 by Westwood One founder and owner of Courtside Entertainment, LLC Norm Pattiz. In mid-2015, Hubbard Broadcasting purchased a 30% stake in the platform. Hubbard radio programs are adding podcasts on the network, including WTOP/Washington D.C.'s Target USA. In November 2015, PodcastOne extended their agreement with Adam Carolla for 5 years, including the entire Carolla Digital line-up. The deal expanded the partnership to involve production and development of new programming. In 2020, PodcastOne was acquired by LiveXLive. More recently, the platform struck a first look deal with Picture Perfect Federation. In March 2016, PodCastOne announced it would be offering premium content subscription services. An Australian affiliate of PodcastOne was launched in September 2017 and is operated by media company Southern Cross Austereo, using its brand name and some of its programming under license. In February 2021, Southern Cross Austereo changed the PodcastOne Australia branding to LiSTNR effectively ending the brand in Australia. Southern Cross Austereo's association with PodcastOne continues, and selected PodcastOne titles may still be available on the LiSTNR platform.

Basic functions
LiveXLive/Slacker offers traditional genre, specialty, and artist stations pre-programmed by professional DJs, while also letting users build entire stations of specific artists. Users can continue to develop any of these stations by rating favorite songs and banning artists or songs they dislike. LiveXLive/Slacker also allows subscribers to customize any station to their liking by adjusting settings like: more hits or more depth, more or less of their favorites, and more current or more classic material. The music could also be interspersed with music, sports and ABC News updates, alongside some DJ banter. LiveXLive also offers access to over 40 live-streamed music events a year such as Rock In Rio, Rolling Loud, and iHeart Country.

When a user inputs the name of a specific band or artist, LiveXLive/Slacker will instantly create a station based on that musician along with similar artists. This feature allows users to discover new artists similar to the ones they already like. Users can also create their own stations by inputting artists they like. The rest of the station is automatically populated with similar songs and artists. Pre-programmed themed stations (holidays, music festivals, and artists) are also available.

In July 2010, Slacker added the ABC News station, with an option to include headline news for top-of-the-hour updates on any Slacker Radio station. In late summer 2011, ESPN channels were also added.

LiveXLive/Slacker allows users to share content via Twitter, Instagram, and Facebook to share news, features, contests and song updates.

See also 
 List of Internet radio stations
 List of online music databases

References

External links

Internet radio in the United States
American music websites
Computer-related introductions in 2007
Android media players
BlackBerry software
Companies based in San Diego
Android (operating system) software